Dan Perrault is an American television writer and producer. He is best-known for the TV series American Vandal, for which he won a Peabody Award.

Career 
In 2011, Perrault co-founded the production company Woodhead Entertainment along with his writing partner, Tony Yacenda, and producing partner, Sean Carrigan.

In 2016, Perrault served as co-creator, writer and executive producer for the series True crime "mockumentary", American Vandal on Netflix.

In 2021, Universal Pictures purchased the rights to Perrault's original screenplay, Strays. Josh Greenbaum is to direct, with Phil Lord and Chris Miller producing.

Also in 2021, Perrault will serve as co-creator, writer and executive producer on Paramount+, for Players, along with long time writing partner, Tony Yacenda.

American Vandal 
Perrault created, wrote and executive produced Season 1 of American Vandal and returned for Season 2. Vandal was Netflix's most binge-watched show of 2017. On April 19, 2018, American Vandal won a 2017 Peabody Award for Entertainment. In July 2018, it was nominated for a Primetime Emmy Award.

References 

American screenwriters
American television producers
Year of birth missing (living people)
Living people